William "Will" Janowitz (born May 25, 1980) is an American actor. He is best known for playing Meadow Soprano's fiancé, Finn DeTrolio, on The Sopranos, Hymie Weiss on Boardwalk Empire (2012–2013), and Trevor in Bikini Moon (2017).

Early life and education 
Janowitz was born on May 25, 1980, in the United States and is a first-generation American. His mother is from Bratislava, Slovakia and his father is from Berlin, Germany. After graduating from the University of North Carolina School of the Arts in 2000, Janowitz began acting professionally.

Career 
He worked briefly as Mary-Louise Parker's personal assistant on several film and television projects. One of his earliest film credits was a role in David Gordon Green's George Washington (2000). In 2003, he and his college friend, Bill English, starred in The Pavement Series for Showtime, in which they played sports inventors. In 2002, he had a role on Law & Order. 

Also in 2002, Janowitz booked a recurring role on The Sopranos as Meadow Soprano's (Jamie-Lynn Sigler) boyfriend Finn DeTrolio. He would appear in the fifth and sixth seasons of the show, portraying a novice's perspective of the organized crime ring. Janowitz's character notably disclosed the homosexuality of Vito Spatafore (Joe Gannascoli), one of Tony Soprano's (James Gandolfini) best-earning captains. 

Janowitz appeared in two episodes of Law & Order: Criminal Intent in 2004 and 2008. He also appeared in one episode of Law & Order: Special Victims Unit in 2013. He has appeared in various independent features, including Backseat (2005) and Bristol Boys (2006). In 2005, he appeared in Grand Theft Auto: Liberty City Stories as the voice of Donald Love. Janowitz joined the ensemble cast of Ang Lee's Taking Woodstock in 2009 and wore a blonde wig and moustache to play Chip Monck, the festival's production designer. That same summer, he went to Marietta, Georgia, to play the role of Leo Frank in The People v. Leo Frank (2009). The film explores the life and trial of Leo Frank, an American-born Jew who was lynched in Marietta, Georgia, on August 17, 1915, after being accused of the murder of a 13-year-old girl who worked in his pencil factory.

Filmography

Film

Television

Video games

References

External links
 

American male actors
1980 births
Living people
Place of birth missing (living people)
American male writers